Kabir Karriem (born February 26, 1973) is an American politician, a Democratic member of the Mississippi House of Representatives based in the 41st district, since January 2016. Previously, he was a Columbus City Councilman for Ward 5.

References

Mississippi city council members
Democratic Party members of the Mississippi House of Representatives
Living people
21st-century American politicians
1973 births